George Emptage (baptised 27 March 1733, in Rotherhithe – 1785) was an English seaman who attained the rank of Commodore in service with the Bombay Marine. He fought in the Second Anglo-Mysore War (1780-84).

George was the son of Thomas Emptage, a mariner and his second wife, Elizabeth Watson, of Rotherhithe.

Second Anglo-Mysore War 
Tipu Sultan had been forced to retreat. Units of the Bombay Marine units under Emptage's command took Rajamundroog at the mouth of the River Merjee in conjunction with General Richard Matthews  who then moved on to Honnavar (Onore). Emptage commanded the Bombay a 28 gun grab.

His daughter, Elizabeth Emptage married Richard Hall Gower. Charles Foote Gower was his grandson.

References 

1733 births
1785 deaths
British East India Company Marine personnel